The fourteenth series of Made in Chelsea, a British structured-reality television programme began airing on 9 October 2017 on E4, and concluded on 25 December 2017 following eleven episodes and a "Christmas Ding Dong" special episode hosted by Rick Edwards. This series featured the return of former cast members Sophie Hermann and Alik Alfus, having last appeared in the ninth series and South of France spin-off respectably.  This was the only series to include new cast member Charlie Mills. Other new cast members include Digby Edgley, James Taylor, Sophie "Habbs" Habboo and Clementine Cuthbertson. It was the final series to include Daisy Robins, Emily Blackwell, Ella Willis and Julius Cowdrey following their unannounced departures during the series. Tiff Watson also announced that she had left the series and would not return for the fifteenth. The series focused heavily on the aftermath of Jamie and Frankie's break-up as they both try to move on from each other, as well as Olivia's new blossoming romance with Digby, and Louise and Ryan's relationship hitting the rocks following the return of her ex-boyfriend Alik. It also included Tiff and Sam T finally accepting they're better off apart.

Cast

Episodes

{| class="wikitable plainrowheaders" style="width:100%; background:#fff;"
! style="background:#58FA58;"| Seriesno.
! style="background:#58FA58;"| Episodeno.
! style="background:#58FA58;"| Title
! style="background:#58FA58;"| Original air date
! style="background:#58FA58;"| Duration
! style="background:#58FA58;"| UK viewers

|}

Ratings

External links

References

2017 British television seasons
Made in Chelsea seasons